The 2009 season is the Sydney FC's first season of football (soccer) in Australia's new women's league, the W-League.

Players

Season

Home and away season

Round 1

Round 2

Round 3

Round 4

Round 5

Round 6

Round 7

Round 8

Round 9

Round 10

Semi-final

Standings

Leading scorers

The leading goal scores from the regular season.

Awards
Golden Boot: Leena Khamis, Sydney FC - 7 goals

Milestones
First game = 4–0 win home V Perth Glory W-League
Largest win = 4–0 win home V Perth Glory W-League
Largest loss = 3–0 loss away V Queensland Roar W-League

Sydney FC (A-League Women) seasons
Sydney Fc W-league